Anne Hillerman is an American journalist from New Mexico, and a  New York Times best-selling author. The daughter of novelist Tony Hillerman, she continued her father's series of Joe Leaphorn-Jim Chee novels following his death, adding officer Bernadette Manuelito as a full partner in solving the crimes.

Biography
She is the daughter of novelist Tony Hillerman and his wife Marie Unzner, and was married to photographer Don Strel who died in 2020. Anne has served as arts editor and editorial page editor, as well as writer, for The Santa Fe New Mexican newspaper and the Albuquerque Journal. Her first books were primarily about travel, local New Mexico points of interest, and restaurants. She and Strel collaborated on Santa Fe Flavors: Best Restaurants and Recipes and Gardens of Santa Fe.

Leaphorn and Chee novels
Tony Hillerman, who died in 2008, was best known for his Leaphorn and Chee mystery novels. Tony Hillerman's Landscapes: On the Road with Chee and Leaphorn was begun by Anne before his death, and includes his comments.  With Anne gleaning locale details from her father's novels, and her husband taking the photographs, she intended it as a book to draw in readers of his novels, a guide for the reader to visualize the New Mexico and Arizona sites from the perspective of the two main protagonists Joe Leaphorn and Jim Chee.

After her father's death, Anne continued the Leaphorn and Chee series, but Leaphorn's involvement is curtailed in the first chapter of the first book, Spider Woman's Daughter. Leaphorn is the victim of an assassination attempt, spends half of the book in a coma, and later was severely limited in his ability to communicate.  Chee and Bernadette Manuelito are the crime solvers from that book forward in the series, with Leaphorn mentioned sporadically in the background but never fully active in the investigations. Spider Woman's Daughter garnered the 2014 Spur Award for Best First Novel from the Western Writers of America, and landed on the New York Times Best Seller list.

She followed that with a change in the series,  Rock With Wings, Song of the Lion  and Cave of Bones, released April 2018, all of which have also been on the  New York Times Best Seller list. Hillerman has continued to publish several more adventures in the series.

Bibliography 

General subjects

1988 (with Mina Yamashita) 
1995 
1998 (with Tamar Stieber) 
2005 
2009  (with Don Strel) 
2010 (with Don Strel) 

Joe Leaphorn and Jim Chee

2009 (photos by Don Strel) 

Joe Leaphorn, Jim Chee and Bernadette Manuelito

2013 
2015 
2017 
2018 
2019 
2021 
2022

References

Novelists from New Mexico
21st-century American women writers
American mystery novelists
American crime fiction writers
Living people
21st-century American novelists
American women novelists
20th-century American non-fiction writers
21st-century American non-fiction writers
20th-century American women writers
University of New Mexico alumni
American travel writers
American women travel writers
1949 births